Kestenbaum is a German surname. Notable people with the surname include:

David Kestenbaum, American radio correspondent
Jonathan Kestenbaum, Baron Kestenbaum, British Labour member of the House of Lords, chief operating officer of investment trust RIT Capital Partners plc
Lawrence Kestenbaum (born 1955), attorney, politician, and the creator of the Political Graveyard website
Louis Kestenbaum (born 1952), American real estate developer
Richard Kestenbaum, partner in Triangle Capital LLC
Ryel Kestenbaum (also called Ryel K), one of the founders of the Pink Mammoth artist collective
Dave Kestenbaum, Director of the Certification for Sustainable Transportation
Wayne Kestenbaum, American poet and cultural critic.

See also 
Meyer Kestnbaum (1896-1960), American businessman and advisor to President Eisenhower

German-language surnames
Jewish surnames